Keith Jerome Jackson (born April 19, 1965) is an American former professional football player who was a tight end in the National Football League (NFL) for the Philadelphia Eagles (1988–1991), Miami Dolphins (1992–1994), and Green Bay Packers (1995–1996).

Early years
Jackson was born in Little Rock, Arkansas.  He attended Little Rock Parkview High School and garnered All-State team honors on offense (tight end) and defense (safety). He was named to the 1983 Parade All-American Team. In 2011, Parade named Jackson to the Top Parade All-America High School Football Players of All Time.

College career
Jackson played for the University of Oklahoma from 1984 to 1987, where he was nicknamed "Boomer Sooner". The Sooners had a 42–5–1 record in his four seasons and won a national championship in 1985. Jackson caught a total of 62 passes for 1,407 yards, at an average of 23.7 yards per catch, and was a College Football All-America Team selection in 1986 and 1987. In the 1986 Orange Bowl, played for the national championship, Jackson caught a 71-yard pass from Jamelle Holieway for a touchdown, the first of his team's two touchdowns in the Sooners' victory over Penn State. Jackson was inducted into the College Football Hall of Fame in 2001. He was later voted Offensive Player of the Century at the University of Oklahoma. He is also a member of Omega Psi Phi.

Professional career
After being drafted by the Philadelphia Eagles in 1988, Jackson recorded 81 receptions for 869 yards, and 6 touchdowns in his first season, along with seven catches for 142 yards in the Eagles' only playoff game that year, and won the NFC Rookie of the Year award. The Eagles team record of 869 receiving yards in Jackson's rookie season was broken by DeSean Jackson in 2008, who also became the first rookie since Keith Jackson to lead the team in receptions. The two are not related.

Having signed a four-year, $6 million contract in 1992, made his Miami Dolphins debut in a 37-10 win versus the eventual AFC champion Buffalo Bills. Jackson recorded four receptions and 64 receiving yards, including a 24-yard touchdown score. 

In his nine seasons, Jackson made the Pro Bowl five times (1988–1990, 1992, 1996). In his final season, Jackson made 40 receptions for 505 yards and a career-high 10 touchdowns, assisting the Green Bay Packers to a 13–3 record and a win in Super Bowl XXXI.

Jackson finished his career with 441 receptions for 5,283 yards and 49 touchdowns.

During his career, every time he had a highlight on NFL Primetime, ESPN anchor Chris Berman would make reference to his famous name by imitating the voice of sports broadcaster Keith Jackson.

After football
Jackson was a color commentator on radio broadcasts for the Arkansas Razorbacks, but is now retired.  His eldest son, Keith Jackson, Jr., played defensive line at Arkansas and was selected by the St. Louis Rams in the 2007 NFL Draft. His younger son, Koilan, played wide receiver at Arkansas; however announced his retirement from college football (due to injuries) on August 25, 2021. Jackson is not related to the ABC sportscaster of the same name.

In November 2012, Jackson was named as a 2013 recipient of the NCAA Silver Anniversary Award, presented each year to six distinguished former college student-athletes on the 25th anniversary of the completion of their college sports careers.

Jackson is also the founder of P.A.R.K., Positive Atmosphere Reaches Kids, a non-profit organization and an outreach program for inner city youths in Little Rock.

References

External links
 
 

1965 births
Living people
All-American college football players
American Conference Pro Bowl players
American football tight ends
College Football Hall of Fame inductees
Green Bay Packers players
Miami Dolphins players
National Conference Pro Bowl players
Oklahoma Sooners football players
Sportspeople from Little Rock, Arkansas
Philadelphia Eagles players
College football announcers
Oklahoma Sooners football announcers
National Football League announcers
Players of American football from Arkansas